Legislative elections were held in Kazakhstan on 20 March 2016. The date was set by president Nursultan Nazarbayev on 20 January 2016, when he dissolved the Mazhilis after it had requested dissolution on 13 January, with the reason cited being the economic crisis caused by low oil prices. Normally, the term of the Mazhilis would have expired in fall of 2016. 

The result was an expected victory for Nur Otan from the exit polls which won an extra seat while the Ak Zhol Democratic Party and Communist People's Party of Kazakhstan maintained their presence in the Mazhilis. The Organization for Security and Co-operation in Europe (OSCE) complained about lack of "genuine political choice” and "pluralism of opinion in the media.”

Background 
From 2014, Kazakhstan had experienced economic crisis as a result of oil price crash in which it is heavily reliant on for revenue and the devaluation of the Kazakhstani tenge that was caused by the country's neighboring and main trading partner of Russia which faced a financial crisis as a result of international sanctions over the Crimean crisis and War in Donbass.

In the 2015 Kazakh presidential election, President Nursultan Nazarbayev won 97.7% of the vote with lack of any opposition candidates. From there, he announced that the Nurly Zhol economic stimulus would remain as top priority in dealing with the economic troubles and that the sanctions against Russia can't be stay forever, believing that the conflict in Ukraine would eventually end in peace. Despite the promises, the price of oil continued dropping and Kazakhstan's exports shrank by 40%. In August 2015, the tenge lost 5% of its value against dollar. Chairman of the National Bank of Kazakhstan Kairat Kelimbetov dismissed the claims of currency devaluation saying that "this is a transition to a freely floating rate when the market itself determines a balanced exchange rate on the basis of supply and demand." The inflation rate though did drop by 3.7% from the beginning of the year because of low oil prices and weak domestic demand. By October 2015, the tenge devalued by 40% and the inflation rate eventually rose again by 13% at the end of the year.

On 13 January 2016, members of the Mazhilis voted unanimously to request Nazarbayev dissolve parliament. The reason was due to Nazarbayev's warning about a potential upcoming "real crisis" that would caused by low oil prices. One week later, Nazarbayev set 20 March 2016 as the date for the snap elections, which would be held concurrently with elections to mäslihats (local legislative bodies).

Electoral system
The 98 directly elected members of the Mazhilis were elected from a single nationwide constituency by proportional representation with a 7% electoral threshold. Seats were allocated using the largest remainder method. If parties had an equal largest remainder, the party that was registered first was awarded the seat. If only one party crossed the threshold, the party with the second highest number of votes was to be awarded at least two seats. A further nine seats were elected by the Assembly of People, a body selected by the President.

Parties 
The table shows the parties that appeared on the ballot:

Campaign

Nur Otan 
Nur Otan party secretary Farhad Quanganov in an interview to Vlast.kz said that "all the necessary organizational and preparatory work has already begun." He called the parliamentary elections “a historic opportunity to become even stronger, even more united, to ensure the effective implementation of five institutional reforms and the Plan of the Nation '100 Concrete Steps'."

17th Extraordinary Congress 
The party held its 17th Extraordinary Congress at the Palace of Independence in Astana on 29 January 2016. Nur Otan presented its electoral program named "Kazakhstan 2021: Unity, Stability, Creation" which noted its achievements in economic growth of 7%, GDP growth per-capita by 17 times, the creation of the National Fund which accumulated over $63.5 billion over 17 years, first industrial programs, Kazakhstan's entry into the top 10 world exporters in grain, and an increase in population by 3 million. President and party chairman Nursultan Nazarbayev assured Kazakhstani citizens that nothing produced in the country should rise, mentioning his personal visit to the markets in Astana where he did not notice much rise in price, except for seasonal cucumbers and tomatoes which Nazarbayev claimed to be due to winter season. The Nur Otan presented its party list of 127 candidates which included well-known politicians, public figures, athletes and artists in the country.

Ak Zhol 
On 3 February 2016, the Ak Zhol Democratic Party held its 8th Ordinary Congress where the party unveiled its list of 35 people. Ak Zhol Chairman Azat Peruashev at the congress said "we are not opposition to our people, our state, our President, for whom we voted. We are the opposition to injustice, incompetence, dishonesty." The party members approved a manifesto called "Ak Zhol - Time to Work", which consisted of ten points: protection of business and giving mass character to entrepreneurship; market reforms and the creation of a productive economy; an educated and healthy nation - strong and ambitious workforce; development of the employment system and reduction of unemployment; housing construction as a driver of the economy; the agro-industrial complex is a reliable support of the country; transparency and accountability of the authorities to the society; development of the spiritual and cultural sphere of the people of Kazakhstan; fight against corruption and judicial and legal reform; security for every home. The Ak Zhol expressed its desire to win at least seven seats in the Mazhilis.

Communist People's Party 
The Communist People's Party of Kazakhstan (QKHP) at its 10th Ordinary Congress on 2 February 2016 announced its party list consisting of 22 people, which included 2015 presidential election candidate Turgyn Syzdyqov. The party announced its intention to preserve the ideas of scientific communism, promote the ideology of Marxism–Leninism in the country and strategic priorities of the implemented social policy of the state to improve the quality of life for citizens. The QKHP urged all the proletarians in Kazakhstan to unite and expressed its support to fight prostitution, drug addiction and embezzlement. The party also proposed a ban on Hollywood blockbusters, believing it to be corrupting Kazakhstani youth.

Auyl 
The Auyl People's Democratic Patriotic Party presented its party list of 19 candidates at its 12th Extraordinary Congress on 1 February 2016, which according to the party's chairman Äli Bektaev, 70% of them worked in production, were heads of districts and cities while some of them were heads of ministries, agencies and first deputies. The Auyl announced its electoral platform in preservation and development of the national culture, development in rural areas through the introduction of modern technologies in the agricultural sector, tight control over the targeted and rational use of agricultural land, reduction in wage gap, establishment of "luxury tax" and the increased quality standards for medical services in the villages, payment towards spouses with 3 or more children, and an increase in scholarships to the level of the social standard of consumption.

JSDP 
The opposition Nationwide Social Democratic Party (JSDP) was the first contesting party to hold its election campaign congress on 31 January 2016. From there, the party presented its list of 27 people from which JSDP Chairman Zharmakhan Tuyakbay stated that "there are a lot of organizational problems, in general, I tried to dodge this party list." Although he expressed doubts about running for seat in the Mazhilis, Tuyakbay noted that with him, the party list would count as 28 candidates. The JSDP adopted an anti-crisis platform titled "Get your voice back, get your country back!" which called to an end in the decline in the living standards of citizens, stopping the collapse of the tenge, transformation of an authoritarian regime to a democratic form of government, and an ensuring of the environmental safety by proposing a ban on the import and disposal of foreign nuclear and other hazardous waste on the territory of Kazakhstan. The party criticized the government's response to the crisis and sought for the expansion of production and consumption.

Birlik 
On 5 February 2016, the Birlik announced its participation in the elections for the first time since the party's foundation in 2013. The Birlik positioned itself as a "party of social justice" which seeks to protect an individual from lawlessness by creating equal opportunities for all citizens regardless of social, ethnic and religious backgrounds. The party announced its decision to prioritize the issues of environmental protection with a goal of establishing a clean Kazakhstan by preserving flora and fauna. The Birlik called for reforms in aimed at creating a more competitive economy and agriculture and an increase in state-defined consumer basket. According to the party's chairman Serik Sultangali, the policies made by Birlik supports the strategic guidelines that were implemented by President Nursultan Nazarbayev.

Conduct

Observers from the Organization for Security and Co-operation in Europe's Office for Democratic Institutions and Human Rights (OSCE/ODIHR), the OSCE Parliamentary Assembly (PA) and the Parliamentary Assembly of the Council of Europe (PACE) announced in their joint press release that the elections had been "efficiently organised with some progress noted, but they indicated that Kazakhstan still has a considerable way to go in meeting its OSCE commitments for democratic elections". The statement added: "The legal framework restricts fundamental civil and political rights, and comprehensive reform is required."

Results

The nine nominees were Sauytbek Abdrahmov, Vladimir Bozhko, Natalya Zhumadildayeva, Roman Kim, Narine Mikaelyan, Ahmet Muradov, Shaimardan Nurumov, Yury Tymochenko and Shakir Khakhazov.

By region

Akmola Region

Aktobe Region

Almaty Region

Atyrau Region

East Kazakhstan Region

Jambyl Region

West Kazakhstan Region

Karaganda Region

Kostanay Region

Kyzylorda Region

Mangystau Region

Pavlodar Region

North Kazakhstan Region

South Kazakhstan Region

City of Astana

City of Almaty

Notes

References

Elections in Kazakhstan
Kazakhstan
Legislative
March 2016 events in Asia